The 1–50 series was a series of Chicago "L" cars built by the St. Louis Car Company in 1959 and 1960. Unlike cars in the similar 6000 series, which were designed for married pair operation, the 1–50 series cars were double-ended to facilitate single car operation. There was a limited need for single cars, however, so cars 5, 7, 9, 11, 15, 19, 21, 23, 24, and 31 were later rebuilt as married units and were renumbered 61a/b–65a/b.

Equipment
Forty-six cars in the series were constructed with components salvaged from Presidents’ Conference Committee (PCC) streetcars which the Chicago Transit Authority (CTA) no longer needed. The majority of the 6000 series also used salvaged components.

The slower speed was adequate for most CTA needs.

Cars 1–4 had high speed test equipment and  wheels.  In 1964 they were modified with a locally designed “pan trolley” for the overhead wires on the high speed Skokie Swift shuttle. Later, cars 23–26 and 29–30 would also have pan trolleys, and 29–30 were also retrofitted with  solid wheels for increased speed.

Cars 27–28 and 39–50 had trolley poles for use on the Evanston line. The line was converted to third rail in 1973, and most trolley equipment was removed.

Routes
The Skokie equipped cars, with their pan trolleys, were too high to operate anywhere else on the system. Up to eight cars were used on this route.

The Evanston equipped cars, with their smaller trolley poles, operated into the loop. Up to sixteen cars were used on this route.

The remaining cars were used on the Ravenswood then West-Northwest routes. They were usually used as two car sets trained with 6000 series cars.

Surviving cars
Most of the 1–50 cars and all of the 61–65 cars were scrapped by the CTA. Only a handful of 1–50 cars survive today in a number of museums in the United States as well as one in Canada.

See also

 Chicago "L"
 5000 series Chicago "L" cars
 PCC streetcar

References

Bibliography

Chicago "L" rolling stock
Train-related introductions in 1961
Railway services discontinued in 1998